Kristina Reiko Cooper is an American cellist. Although she first began her career as a classical artist, she has received critical acclaim for her diversity in music genres.

Biography 
Cooper was born in New York City. Her father, Rex Cooper, is an American pianist and former professor at the University of the Pacific and her mother, Mutsuko Tatman, is a violinist of Japanese descent and concertmaster of the American Symphony. Cooper is the granddaughter of the Japanese composer Tomojiro Ikenouchi and the great granddaughter of haiku poet Takahama Kyoshi. She began her musical studies on the piano before transitioning to the cello. She has received her Bachelors and Masters in Music, and Doctorate in Musical Arts from the Juilliard School. She serves as a visiting professor at Tel Aviv University in Israel.

As a musician, Cooper has premiered works by composers including Ryuichi Sakamoto, Philip Glass, Mario Davidovsky, Josef Bardanashvili, Roberto Sierra, and Patrick Zimmerli.  She has collaborated with artists including Tan Dun, Mitsuko Uchida, Hilary Hahn, Cho-Liang Lin, Wu Man, Anne Akiko Meyers, Hyung-ki Joo and Barry Douglas. She has performed as both a solo artist and a chamber musician at venues including The Walt Disney Concert Hall in Los Angeles, Avery Fisher Hall, The Kennedy Center, Kioi Hall in Tokyo, the Henry Crown Theater in Jerusalem and Radio France. She has played as a soloist with orchestras including The Toronto Symphony, the Shanghai Symphony, the Stockton (California) Symphony and the Yomiuri Nippon Symphony Orchestra. She was a founding member of the Naumburg Award Winning Quartet, The Whitman Quartet, and Intersection Trio, formerly known as Kristina & Laura. She is a member of the classical group Opus X, including Lidia Baich, Ukrainian-Danish pianist Tanja Zapolski, and Danish-British clarinetist Lone Madsen.

Cooper is a published author as a contributing essayist in the book My Jerusalem published by the Geffen Publishing House.

She made her solo debut at Carnegie Hall with the Tel Aviv Academy Orchestra. She was the musical director of The Israel Chamber Music Society, and is currently on the board of the America Israel Cultural Foundation.

Cooper converted to Judaism and currently spends her time between New York and Tel Aviv with her husband, Leonard Rosen, an investment banker, whom she married in 2006. They have three children.

Cooper performs on a 1743 “ex-Havemeyer” cello by Guadagnini and a 1786 cello by William Forster Senior.

Discography

Solo works 

 Around the World with Love (2016)
Joy and Sorrow (2015)
Stone and Steel (2008)

As Kristina & Laura 

 Amorosso (2007)
 Salut D'Amour (2004)
Force of Sound (2003)
 Passion (2002)
Energy (2002)
Intersection (1998)
Manhattan Breeze (1997)

Guest appearances 

 Omaramor (2015)
 The Classical Hour at Steinway Hall (2005)
Travels the Orient Express (With Quartetto Gelato) [2004]
Artur Schnabel: String Quartet (1998)
Roccoco Variations

References

External links 
 
Kristina Cooper performing "Emmanuel" on Youtube

Year of birth missing (living people)
Living people
Juilliard School alumni
Jewish American musicians
Musicians from New York City
American classical musicians of Japanese descent
American classical cellists
American women classical cellists
American women musicians of Japanese descent
21st-century American Jews
21st-century American women